Arase, formerly known as Exploration of energization and Radiation in Geospace (ERG), is a scientific satellite to study the Van Allen belts.  It was developed by the Institute of Space and Astronautical Science of JAXA. While there was a scientist working on a similar project with the surname Arase, the satellite's name has nothing to do with him but instead named after a river beside the launch point.

It was launched aboard Epsilon launch vehicle at 11:00:00, 20 December 2016 UTC into apogee height 32250 km, perigee 214 km orbit.  Subsequent perigee-up operation moved its orbit to apogee 32110 km, perigee 460 km of 565 minutes period.

Spacecraft

The Arase spacecraft is the second satellite based on SPRINT bus, after Hisaki (SPRINT-A).  Arase weighs about 350 kg, measures about 1.5 m × 1.5 m × 2.7 m at launch.  Once in orbit, it will extend four solar panels, two 5 m masts, and four 15 m wire antennas. The spacecraft is spin-stabilized at 7.5 rpm (8 seconds).

Planned mission duration was for one year of scientific observation,  but the mission remains active over 5 years later.

Launch
Arase's launch on the enhanced Epsilon's maiden flight was originally scheduled for 2015, but was postponed to the 2016 financial year due to satellite development delays.

Instruments

Arase carries following instruments:
 XEP-e (Extremely high-energy electron sensor)
 HEP-e (High-energy particle sensor – electron)
 MEP-e (Medium-energy particle sensor – electron)
 LEP-e (Low-energy particle sensor – electron)
 MEP-i (Medium-energy particle – ion)
 LEP-i (Low-energy particle – ion)
 MGF (Magnetic Field Experiment)
 PWE (Plasma Wave Experiment)
 S-WPIA (Software Wave-Particle Interaction Analyzer)

MGF is located at the end of 5 m extended mast.

PWE consists of a search coil (PWE-MSC) located at the end of another 5 m extended mast, four 15 m wire antennae (PWE-WPT), and associated electronics unit (PWE-E).

S-WPIA will analyse the data obtained by other instruments.

See also

 Akebono

References

External links
 Exploration of energization and Radiation in Geospace "ERG", JAXA
 Brochure
 Exploration of energization and Radiation in Geospace ERG, ISAS/JAXA
 Send your name and a message for ERG!
  by JAXA
 ERG Science Center

Satellites of Japan
2016 in Japan
Spacecraft launched in 2016